George Briggs may refer to:
 George Briggs (sealer), English convict and sealer in Van Diemen's Land
 George N. Briggs (1796–1861), seven-term Governor of Massachusetts
 George Briggs (New York politician) (1805–1869), United States Representative from New York
 George Briggs (army) (1808—1875), Major-General in the Madras Artillery
 George Briggs (Oregon politician), member of the Oregon Territorial Legislature, 1855
 G. W. Briggs (George Wallace Briggs, 1875–1959), English hymn writer and Anglican clergyman
 George Edward Briggs (1893–1985), British botanist
 George Briggs (footballer) (1903–?), English footballer
 George Briggs (bishop) (1910–2004), Anglican bishop
 Harry Briggs (George H. Briggs, 1923–2005), English footballer